Major James B. Mulkey (October 4, 1827 – ?), was a Civil War veteran and a mayor of Bloomington.

He was born in Crawford County to James and Elizabeth (Wyman) Mulky, who moved to a farm in Washington Township in 1834.

In 1845 he enlisted in the army to fight in the Mexican–American War and was wounded at the Battle of Buena Vista. Discharged in 1847, he tried various occupations, including teaching, farming, and pharmaceuticals, before going to law school. He graduated in 1858, and practiced law for a time, but reenlisted as the Civil War broke out. In 1861 he was commissioned a Colonel, but as the war ended he became a Major. After the war he returned to his Bloomington, Indiana law practice.

In 1885, he was elected mayor of the city, and later turned to the Limestone business, becoming a manager of the Oolitic Stone Company.

Mulkey married the former Mary J. Coffey on May 31, 1853, and they had six children, including Horace B., James O., and Frank L.

Mayors of Bloomington, Indiana
1827 births
Year of death missing